Hampton County Courthouse is a historic courthouse building located at Hampton, Hampton County, South Carolina. It was built in 1878, and was originally a two-story structure constructed of brick laid in the common bond pattern in the Italianate style. In 1925, the courthouse was renovated and additional wings were added to the front and rear facades. Also located on the property are two small modern annexes situated directly to the rear of the courthouse, and a two-story brick annex (ca. 1935).

It was listed on the National Register of Historic Places in 1978.

References

County courthouses in South Carolina
Courthouses on the National Register of Historic Places in South Carolina
Government buildings completed in 1878
Italianate architecture in South Carolina
National Register of Historic Places in Hampton County, South Carolina
Buildings and structures in Hampton County, South Carolina